The Valbona is a river in northern Albania. It is still relatively untouched. Its source is in the Accursed Mountains, near the border with Montenegro.

The Valbonë flows generally east through the municipality Margegaj (mountain villages Valbonë, Dragobi and Shoshan), then turns south along Bajram Curri, and continues southwest until its outflow into the river Drin, near Fierzë. It is one of the cleanest rivers in the country. The river begins in and flows through the Valbonë valley.

Gallery

See also 
 Environment of Albania
 Rivers of Albania

References 

Rivers of Albania
Geography of Kukës County
Accursed Mountains
Valbonë Valley National Park